Isaac John Salmon (16 November 1851 – 26 November 1932) was a New Zealand cricketer. He played in six first-class matches for Wellington from 1873 to 1882.

See also
 List of Wellington representative cricketers

References

External links
 

1851 births
1932 deaths
New Zealand cricketers
Wellington cricketers
Cricketers from Sydney